Kartaly is a town and the administrative center of Kartalinsky District in Chelyabinsk Oblast, Russia, located in the valley of the Kartaly-Ayat River (left tributary of the Tobol),  southwest of Chelyabinsk, the administrative center of the oblast. Population:

History
It was founded in 1810. Town status was granted to it on April 17, 1944.

Administrative and municipal status
Within the framework of administrative divisions, Kartaly serves as the administrative center of Kartalinsky District. As an administrative division, it is incorporated within Kartalinsky District as the Town of Kartaly. As a municipal division, the Town of Kartaly is incorporated within Kartalinsky Municipal District as Kartalinskoye Urban Settlement.

References

Notes

Sources

External links

Official website of Kartaly 
Kartaly Business Directory  

Cities and towns in Chelyabinsk Oblast